{{DISPLAYTITLE:C4H12N2}}
The molecular formula C4H12N2 (molar mass: 88.15 g/mol) may refer to:

 Dimethylethylenediamines
 1,1-Dimethylethylenediamine
 1,2-Dimethylethylenediamine
 Putrescine
 Tetramethylhydrazine

Molecular formulas